Chicago Branch is a stream in the U.S. state of Mississippi.

The stream's name most likely is a transfer from Chicago, Illinois.

References

Rivers of Mississippi
Rivers of Claiborne County, Mississippi
Mississippi placenames of Native American origin